Evelyn Hope is a poem written by Robert Browning in his work "Men and Women", 1855.

George Saintsbury writes in his "History of Nineteenth Century Literature",

References

Poetry by Robert Browning